Suzanne Maria Malveaux (born December 4, 1966) is an American television news journalist. She co-anchored the CNN international news program Around the World and editions of CNN Newsroom. Malveaux also served as CNN White House correspondent and as primary substitute to Wolf Blitzer on The Situation Room. She joined CNN in 2002 and is based in Washington, D.C.

Early life and education
Malveaux was born in Lansing, Michigan, into a New Orleans-based family, with parents both of Louisiana Creole origin: their roots are of French, Spanish, and African descent. Malveaux has stated that different members of her family identify as white, biracial, and/or black, and that she considers herself black. Her father, Floyd Joseph Malveaux, was a doctor who became the dean of the College of Medicine at Howard University; he was the executive director of the Merck Childhood Asthma Network and a founder of Howard University's National Human Genome Center. Her mother, the former Myrna Maria Ruiz, is a retired schoolteacher.  In an episode of "Finding Your Roots", it was revealed to her that her French roots trace back to a 17th-century French-Canadian fur trader from Quebec, that a seventh-great-grandmother on her father's side (the fur trader's wife) was a Native American of the Kaskaskia tribe, and that one of her ancestors in Louisiana was a free black man who himself owned slaves.

Malveaux graduated from Centennial High School in Ellicott City, Maryland, in 1984, then Harvard College with a B.A. cum laude in sociology, writing a senior thesis based on a semester she spent at Howard University. She graduated with a master's degree in broadcasting from the Columbia University Graduate School of Journalism in 1991.  Malveaux is an honorary member of Alpha Kappa Alpha sorority.

Career
Malveaux's first television job was with New England Cable News as a general assignment reporter in Boston, from 1992 to 1996. She then moved to Washington, D.C., and worked for NBC affiliate WRC-TV from 1996–1999 as a self-described "rock-and-roll" reporter reporting local and crime news.

In 1999, Meet the Press host Tim Russert recruited Malveaux to join NBC News. She reported for three years in Washington, including as a Pentagon correspondent, then in Chicago. She covered national stories such as Bill Clinton's impeachment, Elián González, the Kosovo War, the 2000 Presidential Election, the 9/11 attacks, and the 2001 war in Afghanistan.

In August 2007, Malveaux was the moderator of the 31st annual convention of the National Association of Black Journalists. She had served on various panels at previous conventions of the NABJ, of which she is a member.

In advance of the Democratic and Republican national conventions, Malveaux anchored a 90-minute documentary on Senator Barack Obama as part of a two-part series on the 2008 general election presidential candidates. Additionally, she served as a panelist questioning the candidates in the Democratic presidential primary debate in South Carolina sponsored by CNN and the Congressional Black Caucus in January 2008. She also played a key role in CNN's 2004 election coverage and its Emmy-winning 2006 election coverage.

Malveaux later augmented her White House reporting by serving as the primary substitute anchor for The Situation Room with Wolf Blitzer, a two-hour-long program that airs every weekday on CNN. In 2011, she was named dayside anchor of CNN Newsroom. In 2012, she became host of Aspire's eight-part series, "The Root 100".

In 2014, Malveaux's show Around the World was cancelled, allowing her to return to Washington, D.C., to better care for her mother, who had ALS.

Important interviews and presidential-related travel
As White House correspondent, Malveaux has interviewed former presidents George H. W. Bush, Bill Clinton, and George W. Bush, as well as former first lady Laura Bush. Her coverage of presidential trips overseas has taken her to Europe, the Balkans, Southeast Asia, Africa, Australia, Latin America, and the Middle East. In 2022, Malveaux traveled to the front lines of Russia's war on Ukraine to report for CNN from Lviv.

Personal life
Malveaux has three siblings, one of whom is an identical twin, Suzette M. Malveaux, a professor at the University of Colorado Law School. 
Columnist and former Bennett College president Julianne Malveaux is a distant cousin. Malveaux is also cousin to Real Housewives of Potomac star Gizelle Bryant.

Her family lived in New Orleans and later Howard County, Maryland, and she attended Centennial High School in Ellicott City, Maryland.

Malveaux is in a relationship with White House Press Secretary Karine Jean-Pierre. They live in Washington D.C. with their adopted daughter.

References

External links
CNN - Biography

1966 births
African-American women journalists
African-American journalists
CNN people
Columbia University Graduate School of Journalism alumni
Harvard College alumni
Living people
Louisiana Creole people of Spanish descent
People from Lansing, Michigan
American twins
American women television journalists
PBS people
Henry Crown Fellows
LGBT African Americans
American LGBT journalists
Lesbian journalists
21st-century African-American people
21st-century African-American women
20th-century African-American people
20th-century African-American women